Chouhdary Omar Sarfraz Cheema (born 24 July 1969) is a Pakistani politician belonging to Pakistan Tehreek e Insaf. He has been a founding member of PTI since 1996. He served as the 38th Governor of Punjab from 3 April 2022 to 30 May 2022 and was appointed by Imran Khan. He was removed as Governor and replaced by Muhammad Baligh Ur Rehman on 30 May 2022, with approval from the President of Pakistan. He was later appointed as Advisor to the Chief Minister of Punjab on Information by Chaudhry Pervaiz Elahi. He was further appointed as Advisor to the Chief Minister on Home and Prisons. He ceased to hold both offices on 14 January 2023.

Background
Cheema was born on July 24, 1969 in Wazirabad, Punjab. He has studied at Saint Anthony's School Lahore. He did his graduation from Government College University Lahore.

Political career
He has been the founding member of PTI.

Cheema was appointed as the Governor of Punjab by Imran Khan after the removal of Chaudhry Mohammad Sarwar on 3 April 2022.

Prime Minister Shehbaz Sharif sent a summary for the removal of the Governor of Punjab to President Arif Alvi and he was removed from office on 10 May 2022.

Cheema was inducted into the cabinet of Chaudhry Pervaiz Elahi on 6 August 2022 as Advisor to the Chief Minister on Information. He was also appointed on 13 October 2022 as Advisor to the Chief Minister on Home and Prisons.

References

Living people
Governors of Punjab, Pakistan
Pakistani politicians
Pakistan Tehreek-e-Insaf politicians
People from Gujranwala District
Punjabi people
1969 births